The American Folklore Society (AFS) is the US-based professional association for folklorists, with members from the US, Canada, and around the world, which aims to encourage research, aid in disseminating that research, promote the responsible application of that research, publish various forms of publications, advocate for the continued study and teaching of folklore, etc. The Society is based at Indiana University and has an annual meeting every October. The Society's quarterly publication is the Journal of American Folklore. The current president is Marilyn White.

As of 2016, almost half of its 2,200 members practice their work outside higher education. In addition to professors, members include public folklorists, arts administrators, freelance researchers, librarians, museum curators, and others involved in the study and promotion of folklore and traditional culture.

History 
AFS was founded in 1888 by William Wells Newell, who stood at the center of a diverse group of university-based scholars, museum anthropologists, and men and women of letters and affairs. In 1945, the society became a member of the American Council of Learned Societies. AFS is also an active member of the National Humanities Alliance (NHS).

Over the years, prominent members of the American Folklore Society known outside academic circles have included Marius Barbeau, Franz Boas, Ben Botkin, Jan Harold Brunvand, Linda Dégh, Ella Deloria, William Ferris, John Miles Foley, Joel Chandler Harris, Zora Neale Hurston, James P. Leary, Alan Lomax, John A. Lomax, Kay Turner, and Mark Twain. Past presidents have included Samuel Preston Bayard, Henry Glassie, Diane Goldstein, Dorothy Noyes, and Dell Hymes.

Past Presidents 

 1888–89 Francis James Child  
 1890 Daniel Garrison Brinton 
 1891 Otis T. Mason 
 1892 Frederic Ward Putnam 
 1893 Horatio Hale 
 1894 Alcée Fortier 
 1895 Washington Matthews 
 1896 John G. Bourke 
 1897 Stewart Culin 
 1898 Henry Wood 
 1899 Charles L. Edwards 
 1900 Franz Boas 
 1901 Frank Russell 
 1902 George Dorsey 
 1903 Livingston Farrand 
 1904 George Lyman Kittredge 
 1905 Alice C. Fletcher 
 1906 Alfred L. Kroeber 
 1907–8 Roland B. Dixon 
 1909 John R. Swanton 
 1910–11 Henry M. Belden 
 1912–13 John A. Lomax 
 1914–15 Pliny Earle Goddard 
 1916–17 Robert H. Lowie 
 1918 C. Marius Barbeau 
 1919–20 Elsie Clews Parsons 
 1921–22 Frank G. Speck 
 1923–24 Aurelio M. Espinosa 
 1925–26 Louise Pound  
 1927–28 Alfred M. Tozzer 
 1929–30 Edward Sapir 
 1931 Franz Boas 
 1932–33 Martha W. Beckwith 
 1934 Franz Boas 
 1935–36 Archer Taylor 
 1937–39 Stith Thompson 
 1940–41 A. Irving Hallowell 
 1942 Harold W. Thompson 
 1944 Benjamin A. Botkin 
 1945 Melville J. Herskovits 
 1946–47 Joseph M. Carrière 
 1948 Erminie Wheeler-Voegelin 
 1949 Thelma G. James 
 1950 Ann H. Gayton 
 1951–52 Francis Lee Utley 
 1953–54 William R. Bascom 
 1955–56 Herbert Halpert 
 1957–58 Wayland D. Hand 
 1959–60 William N. Fenton 
 1961–62 MacEdward Leach 
 1963–64 Melville Jacobs 
 1965–66 Samuel P. Bayard 
 1967–68 Richard M. Dorson 
 1969–70 Daniel J. Crowley 
 1971–72 D.K. Wilgus 
 1973–74 Dell Hymes 
 1975–76 Kenneth S. Goldstein 
 1977 Ellen Stekert
 1978 J. Barre Toelken 
 1979 Roger D. Abrahams 
 1980 Alan Dundes 
 1981 Don Yoder 
 1982 Linda Dégh 
 1983 W.F.H. Nicolaisen 
 1984 Bruce Jackson 
 1985 Jan Harold Brunvand 
 1986 Rayna Green 
 1987 Judith McCulloh 
 1988 Alan Jabbour 
 1989–90 Henry Glassie 
 1991–92 Barbara Kirshenblatt-Gimblett 
 1993–94 Sylvia Grider 
 1995–96 Jane Beck 
 1997–98 John Roberts 
 1999-2000 Jo Radner 
 2001 Peggy A. Bulger 
 2002-2003 Jack Santino 
 2004-2005 Michael Owen Jones 
 2006-2007 Bill Ivey 
 2008–2009 Elaine Lawless 
 2010-2011 C. Kurt Dewhurst 
 2012–2013 Diane Goldstein 
 2014-2015 Michael Ann Williams 
 2016-2017 Kay Turner 
 2018-2019 Dorothy Noyes 
 2020-2021 Norma Cantú

Awards 
AFS awards various prizes to honor outstanding work in the field of folklore, at the opening ceremony of the annual AFS meeting. These include the following:

 The Zora Neale Hurston Prize is awarded annually and honors the best student work in the field of African American folklore.
 The Américo Paredes Prize is awarded annually and honors excellence in integrating scholarship and engagement with local communities.
 The Benjamin A. Botkin Prize is awarded annually to honor outstanding achievements by folklorists working in the field of public folklore.
 The Chicago Folklore Prize is awarded annually and honors author(s) for the best scholarly monograph in folklore.

Other prizes are awarded annually, by different sections of the American Folklore Society.
 The Women's Section, inaugurated in 1983, awards two prizes in the memory of anthropologist Elli Köngäs-Maranda.
 The Children's Folklore Section awards the annual  Prize, for the best student essay. It also awards the Iona and Peter Opie Prize approximately every two years to the author of the best recently published scholarly book on children's folklore and annually awards the Aesop Prize and Aesop Accolades.
 The History and Folklore Section awards the biennial Wayland D. Hand Prize for an outstanding book that combines historical and folkloristic perspectives and the Richard Reuss Prize for students of folklore and history.

Every other year (in alternating years), AFS awards the following prizes:
 The American Folklore Society Lifetime Scholarly Achievement Award (even-numbered years) honors folklorists for outstanding accomplishments over a career of scholarship.
 The Kenneth Goldstein Award for Lifetime Academic Leadership (odd-numbered years) honors those who have made contributions to supporting academic programs in folklore for outstanding achievement.

See also 
 Folklife
 Folkloristics
 Public folklore
 Museum folklore

References

External links 
  at americanfolkloresociety.org

Organizations established in 1888
American folklore
Folklore studies
Non-profit organizations based in Indiana
Historical societies of the United States
Professional associations based in the United States
Member organizations of the American Council of Learned Societies
Learned societies of the United States
1888 establishments in the United States